From its beginnings in 1995, the Internet in Malaysia has become the main platform for free discussion in Malaysia's otherwise tightly controlled media environment. As of Q1 2017, Malaysia has broadband penetration rates of 103.6% (per 100 inhabitants) and 81.8% (per 100 households).

History 
Malaysia began its Internet services in 1987 with MIMOS (Malaysian Institutes of Microelectronics Systems) as the sole provider. MIMOS was first established in 1985 to provide critical infrastructure for the advancement of the local electronics industry.  The first Internet service in Malaysia, known as the Rangkaian Komputer Malaysia (RangKoM), connects all the universities in Malaysia to MIMOS to enable researchers from the universities to communicate with each other.  The main applications used at that time were e-mails and electronic forums (such as Usenet) and because the main users were mainly academicians and researchers, the information being exchanged were mostly academic related.  The conception of RangKoM allowed MIMOS and the universities to create the local talent pool in computer networks which at that time was a very new subject area in Malaysia.

In 1992, the Joint Advanced Research Integrated Network (JARING) was conceived by MIMOS as part of the 6th Malaysia Plan to provide Internet services to the nation. JARING was connected to many research and academic institutions, including several government and private agencies. Its main objective is to support the education, research and commercialization activities in Malaysia. JARING also had a gateway to the international Internet.  A leased line to the United States with the speed of 64 kbit/s was introduced on November 1992.

Datacraft Asia provided the Cisco Systems AGS router for the Internet connection to JARING in February 1993.

The year 1995 is considered the beginning of the Internet age in Malaysia. The growth in the number of Internet hosts in Malaysia began around 1996. The country's first search engine and web portal company, Cari Internet, was also founded that year. According to the first Malaysian Internet survey conducted from October to November 1995 by MIMOS and Beta Interactive Services, one out of every thousand Malaysians had access to the Internet (20,000 Internet users out of a population of 20 million). In 1998, this number grew to 2.6% of the population. The total number of computer units sold, which was 467,000 in 1998 and 701,000 in 2000 indicated an increasing growth.

In 2005 the National Public Policy Workshop (NPPW) proposed a strategy to increase the uptake of Information and communications technology (ICT) and the Internet. Among the outcomes of the NPPW was the High Speed Broadband initiative launched in 2010. As of July 2012 Internet users in Malaysia reached 25.3 million. Out of that number, there are 5 million broadband users, 2.5 million wireless broadband users and 10 million 3G subscribers.

In January 2013, Maxis launch their 4G FDD-LTE network, and this is the first ISP in Malaysia launch 4G FDD-LTE network. After a few months, Celcom in April launch their 4G FDD-LTE network. Following ISP is DiGi in July, U Mobile in December. After 3 years in 2016 April, Unifi Mobile launch their 4G TDD-LTE network, and this is the first ISP in Malaysia launch 4G TDD-LTE network. After a few months, Yes 4G in June launch their 4G TDD-LTE network.

Speed 
As of November 2021, Malaysia's average internet speed for fixed broadband is 114.08Mbit/s ranked on 45th ranking. Average speed for mobile connection speed also gone up to 35.06Mbit/s ranked on 76th ranking.

For this market analysis in Q3 2021, TIME dot com was the fastest fixed broadband provider among top providers in Malaysia with a speed up to 120.10Mbit/s. While, the fastest mobile operator among top providers in Malaysia is DiGi, the speed up to 33.19Mbit/s.

Access technologies

Cellular data 
In 2019, the government of Malaysia started trials of 5G network, which will be officially rolling out by the end of this year on Kuala Lumpur, Putrajaya and Cyberjaya.

All ISP are closedown the 3G network nationwide on 31 December 2021. But Digi extended the 3G network shutdown in Northern (Perak , Penang , Kedah , Perlis) and Central (WP.KL / Putrajaya / Selangor) to Jan 3 / Jan 6 2022 respectively because of flood.

5G services in Malaysia was launched on 15 December 2021, and the first run ISP was Yes 4G.  But the Malaysia 5G network was provided by Digital Nasional Berhad as a Single Wholesale Network (SWN) companies. Customers of unifi Mobile should be able to enjoy the 5G services in Malaysia at the same time with Yes 4G , but unfortunately Telekom Malaysia didn't provide any further details after they announced signing up for 5G trials with DNB.

*: Note that the bolded parts of the "Frequency" section is the most used frequency by the mobile operator.

Digital subscriber line (DSL) 
As of June 2012 there were 1,705,000 DSL connections. TM Net (Unifi), a subsidiary of Telekom Malaysia (TM), is Malaysia's largest Internet service provider. While there are many ISPs in Malaysia, TM's ownership of the nation's last mile connections restricts competition to densely populated areas in major cities. Since there is no local loop unbundling, TM Net enjoys a virtual monopoly of the broadband market.

DSL connections are provided by:

Fiber optics 
Telekom Malaysia Bhd has spent about RM1.9 billion, with the inclusion government funds amounting to RM990 million in the installation of high-speed broadband services throughout Malaysia. The four initial areas that will be covered by high speed broadband services, that is being launched in March 2010 are Shah Alam, Subang Jaya, Taman Tun Dr Ismail and Bangsar.

The benefits announced with the implementation of high speed broadband include smoother e-commerce activities, Internet-based health services, voice over IP (VoIP) communications, web surfing that contains detailed pictures and graphics, as well as faster data downloads. It has been promised that video-streaming will be smoother and Internet Protocol television (IPTV) could take off in Malaysia.

Fiber to the x connections are provided by:

{| class="wikitable"
|-
! Internet service provider
! Fiber service coverage
! Internet download speed
!Internet upload speed
|-
| Celcom
|East and West Malaysia
| From 30 Mbit/s to 500 Mbit/s
|From 30 Mbit/s to 100 Mbit/s
|-
| Allo City Broadband (Tenaga Nasional Berhad)
|Selected areas in West Malaysia (Melaka, Perak, Cyberjaya, Kedah, Penang)
| From 50 Mbit/s to 1Gbit/s
|From 50 Mbit/s to 1Gbit/s
|-
| DiGi
|East and West Malaysia
| From 50 Mbit/s to 1 Gbit/s
|From 20 Mbit/s to 200 Mbit/s
|-
| Maxis
|East and West Malaysia
| From 30 Mbit/s to 800 Mbit/s
|From 30 Mbit/s to 200 Mbit/s
|-
| TIME
|West Malaysia
| From 100 Mbit/s to 1Gbit/s
|From 100 Mbit/s to 500 Mbit/s
|-
| Unifi (Telekom Malaysia, service branded as unifi Home / unifi Business Fibre)
|East and West Malaysia
| From 30 Mbit/s to 800 Mbit/s
|From 10 Mbit/s to 200 Mbit/s
|-
| Symphonet
|West Malaysia
| From 50 Mbit/s to 100 Mbit/s
|From 50 Mbit/s to 100 Mbit/s
|-
| PR1MA Communications
|1Malaysia People's Housing Programme
| From 30 Mbit/s to 60 Mbit/s
|From 30 Mbit/s to 60 Mbit/s
|-
| MacroLynx (ViewQwest)
|West Malaysia
| From 1 Mbit/s to 100 Mbit/s
|From 1 Mbit/s to 100 Mbit/s
|-
| ViewQwest (Singapore)
| West Malaysia
| From 100 Mbit/s to 1 Gbit/s
|From 100 Mbit/s to 1 Gbit/s
|}
Below is a list of currently discontinued internet service providers that provided fiber internet:

Hotspot 
Hotspot connections are provided by:

Currently discontinued hotspot services

Internet censorship in Malaysia 

On 30 May 2011, the Malaysia government started to ban some websites, mostly file sharing websites; this is despite a promise not to censor the Internet, made by the sixth prime minister of Malaysia, Najib Razak.

JENDELA Program 
During the Movement Control Order (MCO) that was imposed to curb the spread of the COVID-19 pandemic, Malaysia's internet traffic has increased by 30% to 70%, while the internet speed has dropped by 30% to 40%. Therefore, the Government of Malaysia launched the JENDELA Program (Jalinan Digital Negara).

The program will be the national digital communication enhancement platform under the 12th Malaysia Plan (2021–2025) that will be implemented in two phases:

Phase 1 (2020 – 2022):

Phase 1, which started from 2020 to 2022, will involve optimising existing resources and infrastructure for both mobile and fixed connectivity by:

 Expanding 4G mobile broadband coverage from 91.8% to 96.9% in populated areas;
 Increasing mobile broadband speeds from 25 Mbit/s to 35 Mbit/s; and
 Enabling as many as 7.5 million premises to access gigabit speeds with fixed broadband services.

This will also involve the gradual switch-off/sunset of 3G networks until the end of 2021, allowing further upgrades to 4G networks as well as strengthening the foundation for 5G networks.

Phase 2 (Beyond 2022):

 Phase 2 of JENDELA involves addressing the remainder of the digital divide not covered under Phase 1, primarily utilising FWA and other fit-for-purpose technologies, as well as priming the nation's transition to 5G; which will take place once action plans to build a robust 4G and fibre platform under Phase 1 are achieved.

This also means that Malaysia's 3G network will gradually be closed. If only 2G/3G network coverage is available in some areas, only 2G networks will be available after the 3G network is closed, which will affect consumers’ experience.

Therefore, the current priority of the Malaysian government is to increase 4G network coverage, from 91.8% of Malaysia's 4G coverage to 96.9%.

In addition, they plan to increase the mobile network speed of mobile phones from 25 Mbit/s to 35 Mbit/s.

They will also ensure that 83% premises nationwide will have access to gigabit speed of fixed broadband

In order to ensure that users using 4G to make calls will not fall back to 2G without 3G network coverage, Malaysian telecom operators have launched VoLTE, and some also provide VoWiFi services.

Issues with International Routing

Telekom Malaysia 
For a long time, the international routing of Malaysian telecommunications companies has been criticized. For example, if Telekom Malaysia is connected to a server located in mainland China, it needs to go to Europe and then connect to PoP(s) for mainland China telecommunications companies such as China Telecom at Europe. Then, only the data packet will transfer to the China backbone network. This connection method made the latency and connection quality to connect to China Server from TM users become worst.

In addition, Telekom Malaysia's routing to some Cloudflare's IP isn't very good. Although it is Anycast IP, most TM users will be bypassed to Osaka, Japan or Hong Kong, China and connected to Cloudflare PoP in Osaka or Hong Kong, which brings a bad experience to users.

Furthermore, the internet to Singapore datacenters can be seen congested, everyday from afternoon to midnight. This problem brings a direct impact to the users of Facebook, Twitter, Telegram, Instagram, gaming servers, voice servers that have their server hosted in Singapore. With the severity of COVID-19 pandemic in Malaysia, government have urged citizens to Work From Home, also contributed the matter of congested networks for Telekom Malaysia to International Servers. To make the matter worse, the degradation of Quality of Service have been complained by the Telekom Malaysia Internet users and have been actively ignored by Telekom Malaysia with closing reports regarding the complains with no action taken or updates. Moreover, there is some of other users take the report to Malaysia Communication and Multimedia Commissioner, but with to no avail and yet a response from the authority.

See also 
 Censorship in Malaysia
 History of communications in Malaysia
 National Broadband Initiative (Malaysia)
 Telecommunications in Malaysia

References

External links 
 Johor Bahru Internet Exchange (JBIX)
 Ministry of Communications and Multimedia (KKMM) 
 Malaysian Communication and Multimedia Commission (MCMC)
 Malaysia Internet Exchange (MyIX)
 Telekom Malaysia Speed Test